Photogenics is raster graphic editing software produced by Idruna Software.

Features 
Photogenics can work with different color models like CMYK and HDR. Supported HDR formats include OpenEXR, TIFF, Alias, Cineon/PDX, and others. The program is capable of handling various RAW file formats such as those used by Canon or Nikon cameras.

Platforms 

Photogenics was originally developed for AmigaOS and published by Almathera Systems Ltd. It was later ported to Microsoft Windows, Linux and Microsoft Pocket PC platform. Current version no longer supports Linux.

See also

Comparison of raster graphics editors
List of raster graphics editors
Raster graphics editor
Raster graphics aka Bitmap
Vector editors versus bitmap editors

References

External links 
 Photogenics product page on the Idruna homepage
 AV & Photogenics, a write-up of the Photogenics launch at World of Amiga 1995

Raster graphics editors
Amiga software